Astra 1L, is one of the Astra geostationary satellites owned and operated by SES, was purchased in June 2003.

Launch 
It was launched on 4 May 2007, at 22:29 UTC by an Ariane 5ECA from Centre Spatial Guyanais at Kourou, French Guiana.

Satellite description 
The satellite is based on the A2100AXS satellite bus, manufactured by Lockheed Martin Commercial Space Systems, Newtown, Pennsylvania, and has a minimum service life of 15 years. It features 29 Ku-band and 2 Ka-band transponders to service Europe. SES stated that Astra 1L would replace Astra 2C.

See also 

 SES (satellite operator)
 Astra (satellite family)
 Astra 19.2°E (orbital position)
 Astra 2C

References 

Astra satellites
Satellites of Luxembourg
Spacecraft launched in 2007
2007 in spaceflight
2007 in Luxembourg
Satellites using the A2100 bus